Vassilis Charalampopoulos (alternate spellings: Vasileios, Vasilis, Basilis, Charalabopoulos) (born January 6, 1997) is a Greek professional basketball player for Victoria Libertas Pesaro of the Italian Lega Basket Serie A (LBA).

Early career
He spent the 2011–12 season with the senior men's club of Aigaleo. That same season, he played in the semi-pro level Greek B League, which is the 3rd-tier division of Greek basketball.

Professional career

Panathinaikos (2012–2018)
In 2012, Charalampopoulos moved to the Greek 1st Division club Panathinaikos. He made his pro debut in the 1st-tier level Greek League, during the 2012–13 season, on 26 November 2012, in a home game against Panelefsiniakos. Charalampopoulos made his debut in the European-wide top-tier level EuroLeague, during the 2013–14 season, in a road game against Lokomotiv Kuban, on 13 December 2013.

On June 25, 2016, Charalampopoulos extended his contract with Panathinaikos for eight years, through the 2023–24 season. He was loaned to the Greek club PAOK, for the 2017–18 season. As part of his loan deal to PAOK, his contract with Panathinaikos was also restructured, as he signed a new 4-year contract with them, lasting through the 2020–21 season. The new contract also contained NBA buyout options after each season.

On August 20, 2018, Charalampopoulos and Panathinaikos agreed to prematurely terminate their contract.

PAOK (2017–2018)
On August 16, 2017, Charalampopoulos was loaned to Greek club PAOK, for the 2017–18 season. With PAOK, during the 2017–18 Greek Basket League season, in 24 games played, he averaged 6.5 points, 3.0 rebounds, 1.0 assists, and 0.8 steals per game, in 19.6 minutes per game. He also played with PAOK in the European 3rd-tier level Basketball Champions League (BCL), where in 11 games played, he averaged 7.5 points, 2.5 rebounds, 1.1 assists, and 0.5 steals per game, in 15.9 minutes per game, during the 2017–18 season.

Lavrio (2018–2019)
On August 24, 2018, Charalampopoulos signed a two-year deal (with an opt-out clause prior to the Greek playoffs for the 2019 NBA draft) with Lavrio of the Greek Basket League and the FIBA Europe Cup.

Olympiacos & Ionikos Nikaias (2019–2021)
On August 14, 2019, Charalampopoulos signed a four-year (2+2) deal with EuroLeague side Olympiacos. On September 15, 2019, he was loaned to Ionikos Nikaias of the Greek Basket League for the 2019–2020 season. His loan was prematurely recalled on January 8, 2020, and Charalampopoulos rejoined Olympiacos for their EuroLeague campaign, after a rather successful stint with Ionikos. On July 17, 2021, Olympiacos opted out of their mutual contract and Charalampopoulos became a free agent. In 13 EuroLeague games total with Olympiacos (11 during the 2020–2021 season), Charalampopoulos averaged a playing time of only 7.5 minutes, as well as 2.5 points and 0.6 rebounds per contest.

Reyer Venezia (2021)
On August 1, 2021, Charalampopoulos signed a multi-year deal with Umana Reyer Venezia of the Italian Lega Basket Serie A (LBA).

Fortitudo Bologna (2021–2022)
On December 1, 2021, he transferred to Fortitudo Bologna.

VL Pesaro (2022–present)
On July 17, 2022, he has signed with Victoria Libertas Pesaro of the Italian Lega Basket Serie A (LBA).

National team career

Junior national team
With the junior national teams of Greece, Charalampopoulos played at the 2011, 2012, and 2013 editions of the FIBA Europe Under-16 Championship. He won the bronze medal at the 2013 Under-16 tournament. He also played with Greece at the 2013 TBF Under-16 World Cup in Sakarya, Turkey, where he helped Greece win the gold medal, and was voted to the All-Tournament Team.

In the summer of 2014, Charalampopoulos played at the FIBA Europe Under-18 Championship and helped Greece reach the fourth place of the tournament. He finished the tournament being first in minutes per game, third in points per game and fifth in total rebounds, earning his place in the All-Tournament Team.

In the summer of 2015, Charalampopoulos suffered a right ankle injury in a friendly game against the USA, and doctors initially said that it would be difficult for him to play at the 2015 FIBA Under-19 World cup. Despite the injury, Charalampopoulos was able to play at the tournament, and he scored 21 points against the US in the tournament's semifinal. Greece lost the semifinal game against the US, and Charalampopoulos was then injured once again in the third-place game, against Turkey, which Greece also lost, as they finished in fourth place.

Charalampopoulos also played at the 2015 FIBA Europe Under-18 Championship. In a game against France, he had 13 points, 10 rebounds, and 11 assists, making him the first player since Lithuania's Martynas Andriuškevičius to record a triple double at the same tournament. Eventually, Greece beat Turkey in the tournament's final, by a score of 64–61, and won the gold medal. Charalampopoulos was honoured as the MVP of the tournament. During the tournament, Charalampopoulos averaged 16.6 points, 8.1 rebounds, and 5.2 assists per game.

Charalampopoulos then played at the 2nd division level 2016 FIBA Europe Under-20 Championship Division B, where he won a bronze medal, made the All-Tournament Team, and was named the MVP. He also played at the 2017 FIBA Europe Under-20 Championship, where he won the gold medal and was named MVP of the tournament.

Senior national team
Charalampopoulos became a member of the senior men's Greek national basketball team for the first time in 2016. He was selected as one of 12 players to compete with Greece at the 2016 Turin FIBA World Olympic Qualifying Tournament.

Career statistics

EuroLeague
Cited from euroleague.net

|-
| style="text-align:left;"| 2013–14
| style="text-align:left;" rowspan=4| Panathinaikos
| 1 || 0 || 2.8 || .000 || .000 || .000 || 1.0 || .0 || .0 || .0 || 0.0 || 0.0
|-
| style="text-align:left;"| 2014–15
| 12 || 5 || 8.8 || .571 || .571 || .750 || 1.2 || 0.7 || .3 || .2 || 2.2 || 2.9
|-
| style="text-align:left;"| 2015–16
| 6 || 1 || 9.5|| .375 || .250 || .667 || 2.0 || 1.0 || .2 || .2 || 1.5 || 3.7
|-
| style="text-align:left;"| 2016–17
| 7 || 2 || 4.2 || .333 || .000 || .000 || .3 || .0 || .0 || .0 || .6 || -.1
|- class="sortbottom"
| style="text-align:left;" colspan=2| Career
| 26 || 8 || 7.5 || .464 || .417 || .727 || 1.1 || 0.5 || .2 || .1 || 1.5 || 2.2

Awards and accomplishments

Club career
 3× Greek League Champion: (2013, 2014, 2017)
 5× Greek Cup Winner: (2013, 2014, 2015, 2016, 2017)

Greek junior national team
2013 TBF Under-16 World Cup: 
2013 TBF Under-16 World Cup: All-Tournament Team
2013 FIBA Europe Under-16 Championship: 
2014 FIBA Europe Under-18 Championship: All-Tournament Team
2015 FIBA Europe Under-18 Championship: 
2015 FIBA Europe Under-18 Championship: All-Tournament Team and MVP
2016 FIBA Europe Under-20 Championship Division B: 
2016 FIBA Europe Under-20 Championship Division B: All-Tournament Team and MVP
2017 FIBA Europe Under-20 Championship: 
2017 FIBA Europe Under-20 Championship: All-Tournament Team and MVP

See also
 List of youngest EuroLeague players

References

External links
Euroleague.net profile
FIBA profile
FIBA Europe profile
Eurobasket.com profile
Greek Basket League profile 
Greek Basket League profile 
Hellenic Basketball Federation profile 
Draftexpress.com profile
ASK4Sports.com profile
NBADraft.net profile

1997 births
Living people
Aigaleo B.C. players
Basketball players from Athens
Fortitudo Pallacanestro Bologna players
Greek men's basketball players
Lavrio B.C. players
Olympiacos B.C. players
Panathinaikos B.C. players
P.A.O.K. BC players
Power forwards (basketball)
Small forwards
Victoria Libertas Pallacanestro players